Jaberi Bidandi Ssali, also Bidandi Ssali (born 1937), is a veteran Ugandan politician and businessman. He is the founder of the People's Progressive Party in Uganda and served as its president. Previously  he was Minister for Local Government from 1989 to 2004. He was an unsuccessful candidate in the 2011 presidential elections.

Background and education
Bidandi was born in Butambala District, in the Central Region of Uganda, on 17 July 1937 to Bumaali Kakonge Matembe and Nalongo Eriosi Bulyaba. He attended local elementary schools before joining Kibuli Junior School. He transferred to Nyakasura School for his A-Level education. He studied at a university in Pakistan, pursuing a degree in agriculture, but left before graduation. He holds the degree of Bachelor of Arts in Local Governance and Human Rights, obtained from Uganda Martyrs University. , he was pursuing a master's degree from the same university.

Career
At the time of Uganda's independence in 1962, Bidandi Ssali was a mobilizer for the Uganda People's Congress, led by Milton Obote, Uganda's first Prime Minister. During the regime of Idi Amin, he turned his focus to football, coaching Kampala Capital City Authority FC from 1974 until 1979. For a period of about 60 days in 1978, Bidandi was the team coach for the Uganda National Team, The Cranes, the year they made it to the African Cup of Nations finals against Ghana.

In 1980, when Yoweri Museveni went to the bush to wage the National Resistance War, Bidandi did not go with him, although he clandestinely offered assistance to NRA supporters who sought his help. When Museveni won that war, Bidandi worked with him in the new government as Minister of Local Government from 1989 until 2004. In 2004, he resigned from the Cabinet after disagreeing with Museveni over the latter's desire to run for a third term as president.

Other considerations
 Jaberi Bidandi Ssali's sister, Deborah Nakafeero Wavamunno, was at one time married to Kirunda Kivejinja.
 Bindandi, Kivejinja and former Prime Minister Kintu Musoke were shareholders in Sapoba Printing Press & Bookshop, a 1970s Kampala publishing house and bookstore, which has since gone out of business. Bidandi used his proceeds from the dissolution of Sapoba to open Kiwatule Recreational Centre.
 Bidandi Ssali is the biological father of music artist Bebe Cool.

See also
 Nakawa Division
 Kirunda Kivejinja
 Kintu Musoke

References

External links
 Brief Biographical Sketch

1937 births
Uganda Martyrs University alumni
Ganda people
Living people
People from Butambala District
Government ministers of Uganda
Members of the Parliament of Uganda
Ugandan Muslims